= Michael Devetsikiotis =

Michael Devetsikiotis is a professor of electrical and computer engineering at University of New Mexico who was named Fellow of the Institute of Electrical and Electronics Engineers (IEEE) in 2012 for contributions to rare-event modeling of communication networks.

Born in Thessaloniki, Greece, Devetsikiotis obtained his diploma in electrical engineering from Aristotle University of Thessaloniki in 1988. Two years later, he got his M.S. in electrical engineering from the North Carolina State University and three years later got a Ph.D. in the same field from the same university. From October 1993 to June 1995, Devetsikiotis served as a postdoc with the Department of Systems and Computer Engineering at Carleton University and until August 1996 was its research associate and adjunct professor. Following it, he served as an assistant professor from September 1996 to June 1998 at the same university and in July 1998 he became an associate professor at the Systems and Computer Engineering department of Carleton University. He then relocated to the North Carolina State University where he continued his position as an associate professor from October 2000 to June 2006. Devetsikiotis became a professor at the Department of the Electrical and Computer Engineering in July 2006 and served as such until June 2016. Since July 2016, he serves as professor and department chair at the Department of the Electrical and Computer Engineering of the University of New Mexico.
